Thomas Rogers Shearon (April 1825-August 1887) was an American politician.

Shearon was born in Alabama in April 1825, and entered Yale College in 1846 as a resident of Harpeth Shoals, Williamson County, Tennessee.  After graduation in 1849, he settled in Davidson County, Tennessee, as a farmer, but removed in April, 1852, to Dyer County, in the same State. In the fall of 1853 he entered the Law School of Harvard University, where he received the degree of LL.B in July, 1855.  After two years spent in practicing law and in teaching in the vicinity where he had last resided, he settled in April, 1857, in Troy, the county seat of Obion County, Tennessee, where he continued in the practice of his profession and in farming until his death. He served during the American Civil War as Major of the 47th Confederate Tennessee Regiment.  At a later date he was elected to the Tennessee State Senate.  He died in Troy, near the end of August, 1887, in his 63rd year.

He married in September, 1849, Mary J. Lowe, by whom he had nine children.

External links

1825 births
1887 deaths
People from Alabama
Yale College alumni
Harvard Law School alumni
Tennessee lawyers
Confederate States Army officers
Tennessee state senators
19th-century American politicians
19th-century American lawyers